The 2016 Lima Challenger is a professional tennis tournament played on clay courts. It is the tenth edition of the tournament which is part of the 2016 ATP Challenger Tour. It takes place in Lima, Peru between October 24 and October 30, 2016.

Singles main-draw entrants

Seeds

 1 Rankings are as of October 17, 2016.

Other entrants
The following players received wildcards into the singles main draw:
  Nicolás Álvarez
  Gastão Elias
  Nicolás Jarry
  Juan Pablo Varillas

The following players received entry from the qualifying draw:
  Andrea Collarini
  Facundo Mena
  Hans Podlipnik
  João Pedro Sorgi

The following players entered as lucky losers:
  Michael Linzer
  Juan Ignacio Londero

Champions

Singles

  Christian Garín def.  Guido Andreozzi, 3–6, 7–5, 7–6(7–3).

Doubles

  Sergio Galdós /  Leonardo Mayer def.  Ariel Behar /  Gonzalo Lama, 6–2, 7–6(9–7).

External links
Official Website

Lima Challenger
Lima Challenger
October 2016 sports events in South America
2016 in Peruvian sport